Charles Connell and Company was a Scottish shipbuilding company based in Scotstoun in Glasgow on the River Clyde.

History
The company was founded by Charles Connell (1822-1894) who had served an apprenticeship with Robert Steele and Co before becoming manager of Alexander Stephen and Sons Kelvinhaugh yard before he started shipbuilding on his own account at Scotstoun in 1861 initially concentrating on sailing ships.

From 1918 the Company became well known for high quality passenger and cargo ships. The yard closed from 1930 to 1937 due to the Great Depression, before rearmament efforts stimulated demand.

In 1968 the yard passed from Connell family ownership after 107 years and became part of Upper Clyde Shipbuilders.

The Scotstoun yard continued to be operated by Upper Clyde Shipbuilders until 1971, when the company collapsed and, from 1972 to 1980, by Scotstoun Marine Ltd, a subsidiary of Govan Shipbuilders.

The Connell shipyard was closed in 1980 after 119 years of shipbuilding. The site was cleared of cranes although some evidence of the building berths remained visible until about 2004. Part of the yard's covered facilities are used by steel stockholders GKN whilst the riverside berth has been used by Motherwell Bridge Engineering for heavy fabrication work.

Ships built

Connells built a total of 516 ships at Scotstoun. They include:
 Wild Deer (1863) - composite clipper ship
 Michael Angelo (clipper) (1865) - sailing clipper
  (1865) — sailing clipper
 Spindrift (1867) - composite clipper ship
  (1873) — sailing ship
 SS City of Agra (1879) - cargo steamer  
  (1886) — iron-hulled sailing ship, preserved at the San Francisco Maritime Museum
  (1894) — iron-hulled sailing ship
 Knight Errant (1897) - cargo ship
 Saturnia (1910) – passenger steamship
  sloops  and 
 s ,  and 
 s  and 
 SS Clan Skene (1919)
 SS Diplomat (1921)
 SS Traveller (1922)
 SS Auditor (1924)
 SS Benvenue (1927)
 SS Benmohr (1928)
 SS Benwyvis (1929)
 SS Traprain Law (1930)
 SS Rothermere (1938)
 SS Narwik (1942) — Polish Empire B class cargo steamship
  (1943) — MoWT cargo steamship
  (1947) – passenger-cargo ship

References

External links
 The Clyde-built ships data base – lists over 22,000 ships built on the Clyde

Defunct shipbuilding companies of Scotland
River Clyde
Manufacturing companies established in 1861
Manufacturing companies disestablished in 1980
1861 establishments in Scotland
1980 disestablishments in Scotland
British companies established in 1861
Companies based in Glasgow
British companies disestablished in 1980
British Shipbuilders